Melhania forbesii is a plant in the mallow family Malvaceae, native to southern Africa. It is named for the English naturalist and plant collector John Forbes.

Description
Inflorescences may be one to four-flowered, generally three-flowered. The flowers feature yellow petals.

Distribution and habitat
Melhania forbesii is native to Angola, Botswana, Mozambique, Namibia, South Africa (KwaZulu-Natal, Northern Provinces), Eswatini, Zambia and Zimbabwe. Its habitat includes sandy areas, open woodland, by rivers and on hillsides.

References

forbesii
Flora of Southern Africa
Flora of South Tropical Africa
Plants described in 1868